Hélène Rochette is a Québécois artist in visual arts oriented towards the field of sculpture.

In 1982, she obtained a bachelor's degree in visual arts from the Université Laval in the City of Québec.

She created several public art pieces, including Les fluides for the Montreal Metro at the Montmorency station.

References

External links
Official website
Montreal Metro - Hélène Rochette

Artists from Quebec
Université Laval alumni
Canadian sculptors
Living people
Year of birth missing (living people)